Italy competed at the 2020 Summer Paralympics in Tokyo, Japan, from 24 August to 5 September 2021. This was their sixteenth consecutive appearance at the Summer Paralympics since 1960.

Medalists

Archery 

Italy qualified eight archers: Matteo Bonacina, Giampaolo Cancelli, Elisabetta Mijno, Asia Pellizzari, Vincenza Petrilli, Eleonora Sarti, Stefano Travisani and Maria Andrea Virgilio.

Athletics 

The athletics team is made up of 11 athletes, 6 women and 5 men. To the nine athletes classified by right, the Italy team added two more participation cards a few days before the start of the Games.

Men's track

Men's field

Women's track

Women's field

Badminton

Rosa De Marco has qualified to compete at the Games.

Cycling 

Katia Aere, Pierpaolo Addesi, Fabio Anobile, Paolo Cecchetto, Diego Colombari, Fabrizio Cornegliani, Giorgi Farroni, Luca Mazzone, Francesca Porcellato, Andrea Tarlao and Ana Vitelaru have all qualified to compete.

Equestrian 

Sara Morganti, Francesca Salvadé, Carola Semperboni and Federica Sileoni have all qualified to compete.

Paracanoeing 

Veronica Silvia Biglia, Eleonora De Paolis, Esteban Gabriel Farias and Federico Mancarella have all qualified to compete.

Paratriathlon 

Giovanni Achenza, Anna Barbaro, Alberto Buccoliero, Rita Cuccuru and Veronica Yoko Plebani have all qualified to compete.

Powerlifting 

Donato Telesca has qualified to compete at the Games.

Rowing

Italy qualified two boats in the mixed events for the games. Mixed coxed four crews qualified by winning the bronze and securing the third of available place at the 2019 World Rowing Championships in Ottensheim, Austria. Meanwhile, mixed double sculls crew qualified by winning the gold medal at the 2021 Final Paralympic Qualification Regatta in Gavirate.

Qualification Legend: FA=Final A (medal); FB=Final B (non-medal); R=Repechage

Shooting

Italy entered three athletes into the Paralympic competition. Pamela Novaglio successfully break the Paralympic qualification at the 2018 WSPS World Championships which was held in Cheongju, South Korea and two others qualified from 2018 WSPS World Cup which was held in Châteauroux, France.

Sitting volleyball 

Italy's women's sitting volleyball team qualified for the 2020 Summer Paralympics after winning the 2019 Sitting Volleyball European Championships in Budapest, Hungary in July 2019.

Summary

Women's tournament 

Group play

Fifth place match

Swimming 

Italy qualified 29 swimmers.

Men

Women

Mixed

Table tennis

Italy entered seven players into the Games. Giada Rossi qualified from the 2019 ITTF European Para Championships which was held in Helsingborg, Sweden and other four athletes qualified via World Ranking allocation.

Men

Women

Taekwondo

Italy qualified one athletes to compete at the Paralympics competition. Antonino Bossolo qualified by entered top six in the world ranking.

Wheelchair fencing  

Matteo Betti, Marco Cima, Edoardo Giordan, Emanuele Lambertini, Ionela Andreea Mogos, Rossana Pasquino, Loredana Trigilia and Beatrice Vio have all qualified to compete.

Wheelchair tennis

Italy qualified one players entries for wheelchair tennis. She qualified by world ranking.

See also 
 Italy at the Paralympics
 Italy at the 2020 Summer Olympics

Notes

References

External links
Italian Paralympic Committee

Nations at the 2020 Summer Paralympics
2020
2021 in Italian sport